Aaron Woods (born August 5, 1986) is a high school football coach and a former professional American and Canadian football player. Woods spent 2010 through 2012 playing in the United Football League for the Sacramento Mountain Lions and Las Vegas Locomotives. He played college football at Santa Rosa Junior College, and Portland State.  He played high school football at Sunset High School in Beaverton, Oregon.

College career
After playing at Santa Rosa Junior College, Woods transferred to Portland State in 2007. In 2008, Woods had 1,028 receiving yards and a school record 908 kickoff return yards, breaking Shaun Bodiford's record of 724 kickoff return yards in 2005. In 2009, Woods broke his own record with 1,314 kickoff return yards. Woods also holds the record for career kickoff return yards with 2,222, breaking Orshawante Bryant's 1806.

Professional career

UFL
Woods played for the Sacramento Mountain Lions in 2010 and 2011. In 2011, he was named the UFL's special teams player of the year after leading the league with a 23.6-yard kickoff-return average. Woods played for the Las Vegas Locomotives in 2012.

CFL
Woods signed with the Winnipeg Blue Bombers on July 8, 2013. Woods was injured on September 1 and missed the rest of the 2013 season. He was released by the Blue Bombers on November 2, 2014.

References

1986 births
Living people
American players of Canadian football
Canadian football wide receivers
Canadian football slotbacks
Canadian football return specialists
American football return specialists
Players of American football from Portland, Oregon
American football wide receivers
Portland State Vikings football players
Sportspeople from Portland, Oregon
Winnipeg Blue Bombers players
Sacramento Mountain Lions players
Las Vegas Locomotives players
Sunset High School (Beaverton, Oregon) alumni
High school football coaches in Oregon